Neoeromene lutea is a moth in the family Crambidae. It was described by David E. Gaskin in 1989. It is found in Santa Catarina, Brazil.

References

Diptychophorini
Moths described in 1989